Maitland McDonagh is an American film critic and the author of several books about cinema.

She is the author of Broken Mirrors/Broken Minds: The Dark Dreams of Dario Argento (1991) and  works of erotic fiction and erotic cinema, as well as providing DVD commentary. She is the founder of 120 Days Books, which became an imprint of Riverdale Avenue Books. In 2022, she was inducted into the Rondo Hatton Classic Horror Awards' Monster Kid Hall of Fame.

Early life
McDonagh was born in New York City, the daughter of Don McDonagh, a dance critic and author, and Jennifer Jane Tobutt,  She received her Bachelor of Arts from Hunter College and her Master of Fine Arts from Columbia University, where she co-founded and edited the Columbia Film Review. She was simultaneously working in the publicity department of the New York City Ballet under George Balanchine and Peter Martins, eventually becoming head of publicity.

Career 
In 1991, McDonagh released her book Broken Mirrors, Broken Minds, which offers commentary on the films of Dario Argento.

After leaving New York City Ballet, McDonagh taught film as an adjunct professor at Hunter College and Brooklyn College, during which time she completed Filmmaking on the Fringe: The Good, The Bad, and the Deviant Directors and The 50 Most Erotic Films of All Time. Her freelance work during this period included film pieces for The New York Times.

Her book Movie Lust, third in the Sasquatch Books series begun with Book Lust by Nancy Pearl and Music Lust by Nic Harcourt, was published August 28, 2006. Later that year, she became the founding vice-president of the Alliance of Women Film Journalists. She is also a member of the New York Film Critics Online.

In 2014, McDonagh created the company 120 Days Books to republish rare 1970s and 1980s gay-erotica genre novels, beginning with a pair of two-in-one volumes: the crime thrillers Man Eater and Night of the Sadist and the supernatural fantasies Vampire's Kiss and Gay Vampire. Later in the decade, this became an imprint of Riverdale Avenue Books.

McDonagh provides interviews and second-channel commentary on DVD / Blu-ray releases, including for director Paul Schrader's Blue Collar, and Tenebrae, and liner notes, including for the Criterion Collection releases The Tunnel, The Innocents, Kuroneko, and the paired Corridors of Blood/The Haunted Strangler,  and Arrow Video's Dressed to Kill. She stars in a documentary short, speaking on serial-killer cinema, on the Criterion Collection release of The Silence of the Lambs.

McDonagh contributed weekly commentary as the American correspondent for British Armed Forces Radio in 2004.

Works 
Broken Mirrors/Broken Minds:  The Dark Dreams of Dario Argento, (London, England, Sun Tavern Fields, 1991; reissued New York, Citadel Press, 1994) 
Filmmaking on the Fringe: The Good, the Bad, and the Deviant Directors (New York, Carol Publishing Corporation, 1995) 
The 50 Most Erotic Films of All Time: From Pandora's Box to Basic Instinct (New York, Carol Publishing Corporation, 1996)  
Movie Lust: Recommended Viewing for Every Mood, Moment, and Reason (Seattle, Wash., Sasquatch Books, 2006)

As co-author
Lassalle, Nancy, and Maitland McDonagh, Lincoln Kirstein, Peter Martins, Jerome Robbins, New York City Ballet: Fortieth Anniversary (New York, New York City Ballet, 1988)

As editor
McDonagh, Maitland (editor). Holiday Gay: Tales of Love, Lust, Romance and Other Seasonal Gifts (2018) New York: Riverdale Avenue Books.

Anthologies
Maitland McDonagh essays appear in:

References

External links
 

 Interview with Maitland McDonagh at Behind the Couch

Year of birth missing (living people)
Living people
Hunter College alumni
American film critics
Columbia University School of the Arts alumni
Writers from Manhattan